Catocala allusa or Catocala faustina allusa is a moth of the  family Erebidae. It is found from British Columbia, south through Washington to northern California. It is also found in Oregon and possibly western Nevada.

Adults are on wing from July to August depending on the location. There is probably one generation per year.

The larvae feed on Populus and Salix species.

References

External links
Species info

allusa
Moths of North America
Moths described in 1884